Maonan is a district of Maoming, Guangdong province, China.

County-level divisions of Guangdong
Maoming